The United States Olympic & Paralympic Hall of Fame is an honor roll of the top American Olympic and Paralympic athletes headquartered at the United States Olympic & Paralympic Museum, opened in April 2020 in Colorado Springs, Colorado.

The Hall of Fame was established by the United States Olympic & Paralympic Committee in 1979; the first members were inducted in 1983.  Between 1992 and 2003, the Hall of Fame went dormant, with no induction of new members. In 2004, the honor was revived, and continued in 2005 when the Class of 2006 was selected.

The current process for selecting inductees is two-staged. Fifteen finalists are selected by a nominating committee consisting of athletes, members of the U.S. Olympic Hall of Fame, historians and USOC representatives. The inductees were then selected based on online voting at www.usolympicteam.com, with a requirement to select five individual athletes, one team, one Paralympian and one coach. When the inductees are announced, a veteran and a "special contributor" are also included.

As of 2022, total membership has been brought to 119 Olympians and Paralympians, 11 teams, five coaches, 10 veterans, 19 contributors and two Olive Branch award inductees.

Inducted as individuals

 Tenley Albright (figure skating)
 Cassius Clay (boxing)
 Evelyn Ashford (track & field)
 Shirley Babashoff (swimming)
 Bruce Baumgartner (wrestling)
 Bob Beamon (track & field)
 Joan Benoit (track & field)
 Matt Biondi (swimming)
 Bonnie Blair (speed skating)
 Brian Boitano (figure skating)
 Ralph Boston (track & field)
 Dick Button (figure skating)
 Candace Cable (Para alpine skiing, Para Nordic skiing, Para track and field)
 Lee Calhoun (track & field)
 Milt Campbell (track & field)
 John Carlos (track & field)
 Connie Carpenter-Phinney (cycling, speed skating)
 Tracy Caulkins (swimming)
 Alice Coachman (Track & Field)
 James Brendan Connolly (track & field)
 Bart Conner (gymnastics)
 Natalie Coughlin (swimming)
 Charles Daniels (swimming)
 Willie Davenport (track & field)
 Glenn Davis (track & field)
 John Davis (weight lifting)
 Muffy Davis (Para alpine skiing and Para-cycling)
 Oscar de La Hoya (boxing)
 Donna de Varona (swimming)
 Gail Devers (track & field)
 Babe Didrikson (track & field)
 Harrison Dillard (track & field)
 Jean Driscoll (Para track & field)
 Eddie Eagan (bobsledding, boxing)
 Teresa Edwards (basketball)
 Janet Evans (swimming)
 Lee Evans (track & field)
 Ray Ewry (track & field)
 Lisa Fernandez (softball)
 Peggy Fleming (figure skating)
 George Foreman (boxing)
 Dick Fosbury (track & field)
 Gretchen Fraser (alpine skiing)
 Joe Frazier (boxing)
 Dan Gable (wrestling)
 Rowdy Gaines (swimming)
 Diana Golden Brosnihan (Paralympic skiing)
 Florence Griffith-Joyner (track & field)
 Gary Hall, Jr. (swimming)
 Dorothy Hamill (figure skating)
 Scott Hamilton (figure skating)
 Mia Hamm (soccer)
 Bob Hayes (track & field)
 Eric Heiden (speed skating)
 Dan Jansen (speed skating)
 Carol Heiss Jenkins (figure skating)
 Bruce Jenner (track & field)
 Michael Johnson (track & field)
 Rafer Johnson (track & field)
 Jackie Joyner-Kersee (track & field)
 Duke Kahanamoku (swimming)
 John B. Kelly Sr. (rowing)
 David Kiley (Para alpine skiing, Para track and field, and wheelchair basketball)
 Micki King (diving)
 Roger Kingdom (track and field)
 Karch Kiraly (volleyball)
 Tommy Kono (weight lifting)
 Alvin Kraenzlein (track & field)
 Michelle Kwan (figure skating)
 Sammy Lee (diving)
 Sugar Ray Leonard (boxing)
 Lisa Leslie (basketball)
 Carl Lewis (track & field)
 Kristine Lilly (soccer)
 Nastia Liukin (gymnastics)
 Greg Louganis (diving)
 Helene Madison (swimming)
 Phil Mahre (alpine skiing)
 Bob Mathias (track & field)
 Misty May-Treanor (beach volleyball)
 Pat McCormick (diving)
 Andrea Mead Lawrence (alpine skiing)
 Mary T. Meagher (swimming)
 Debbie Meyer (swimming)
 Shannon Miller (gymnastics)
 Billy Mills (track & field)
 John Morgan (Paralympic swimming)
 Bobby Morrow (track & field)
 Edwin Moses (track & field)
 John Naber (swimming)
 Dan O'Brien (track & field)
 Parry O'Brien (track & field)
 Al Oerter (track & field)
 Apolo Anton Ohno (short track speed skating)
 Jesse Owens (track & field)
 Charley Paddock (track & field)
 Floyd Patterson (boxing)
 Michael Phelps (swimming)
 J. Michael Plumb (equestrian)
 Erin Popovich (Para swimming)
 Mary Lou Retton (gymnastics)
 Bob Richards (track & field)
 David Robinson (basketball)
 Wilma Rudolph (track & field)
 Don Schollander (swimming)
 Jack Shea (speed skating)
 Mel Sheppard (track & field)
 Frank Shorter (track & field)
 Tommie Smith (track & field)
 Randy Snow (Paralympic basketball, tennis, track & field)
 Mark Spitz (swimming)
 Picabo Street (alpine skiing)
 Jenny Thompson (swimming)
 Jim Thorpe (track & Field)
 Bill Toomey (track & Field)
 Dara Torres (swimming)
 Wyomia Tyus (track & field)
 Amy Van Dyken (swimming)
 Peter Vidmar (gymnastics)
 Lindsey Vonn (alpine skiing)
 Chris Waddell (Para alpine skiing, Para track & field)
 Johnny Weissmuller (swimming)
 Willye White (track & field)
 Mal Whitfield (track & field)
 Lones Wigger (shooting)
 Sarah Will (Paralympic alpine skiing)
 Frank Wykoff (track & field)
 Kristi Yamaguchi (figure skating)
 Trischa Zorn-Hudson (Para swimming)

Inducted as teams

 1956 Men's Basketball team
 1960 Ice Hockey team
 1960 Men's Basketball team
 1964 Men's Basketball team
 1976 Women's 4×100 Freestyle Relay Swimming Team
 1980 Ice Hockey team
 1984 Men's Gymnastics team
 1992 Men's Basketball team
 1996 Women's Gymnastics team (Magnificent Seven)
 1996 Women's Soccer team
 1998 Women's Ice Hockey team
 2002 Paralympic Sled Hockey Team
 2004 Women's Softball team

Inducted as coaches
 Herb Brooks (ice hockey)
 Carlo Fassi (figure skating)
 Abie Grossfeld (gymnastics)
 Ron O'Brien (diving)
 Pat Summitt (basketball)
 Ed Temple (track & field)

Inducted as contributors

 Roone Arledge
 Avery Brundage
 Asa Smith Bushnell III
 Dick Ebersol
 Bud Greenspan
 Col. Don Hull
 Hank Iba
 Robert Kane
 John B. Kelly Jr.
 Frank Marshall
 Jim McKay
 Billie Jean King
 F. Don Miller
 Tim Nugent (special contributor)
 William Simon
 Ted Stevens
 Peter Ueberroth
 LeRoy Walker

Olive Branch Award
 James L. Easton
 Kevan Gosper

See also
 USOC Athlete of the Year
 USOC Coach of the Year

References

External links
 U.S. Olympic & Paralympic Hall of Fame
United States Olympic & Paralympic Museum

United States at the Olympics
All-sports halls of fame
Olym
Awards established in 1979
1979 establishments in the United States